Joseph Zerafa (born 31 May 1988) is a Maltese international footballer who plays for Hibernians as a left back.

Club career
Zerafa has played club football in Malta for Birkirkara. In September 2014, Zerafa joined Isthmian League Premier Division club Grays Athletic in England. He moved to Conference Premier side Welling United in January 2015.

However, Zerafa failed to make an appearance for Welling and returned to Birkirkara in February 2015.

In June 2017 Zerafa signed a five-year deal with Valletta.

International career
He made his international debut for Malta in 2011.

References

1988 births
Living people
Place of birth missing (living people)
Maltese footballers
Malta international footballers
Birkirkara F.C. players
Grays Athletic F.C. players
Welling United F.C. players
Maltese Premier League players
Isthmian League players
Association football fullbacks
Maltese expatriate footballers
Maltese expatriate sportspeople in England
Expatriate footballers in England
Hibernians F.C. players